The Anglican Church of St. John the Evangelist, also known simply as St. John's, is located in İzmir, Turkey, in the quarter of Alsancak. It was built about 1625 by the Levant Company.

History
John mentions Smyrna, the modern İzmir, in Revelations 2:8-11 and one of his disciples, Polycarp, who is depicted in one of the stained glass windows
of the church became bishop of Smyrna.
The church shares its name with the catholic cathedral of İzmir.

The church was built in 1898-1899.

On 22 March 1911, William Collins, the Bishop of Gibraltar, died on board of the SS Saghalien en route from
Constantinople to Smyrna and was subsequently buried in the church.

The New Zealander Charles Dobson (1886-1930) was Chaplain of St. John's during the Great fire of Smyrna in 1922; he escaped the burning city with his wife and two small daughters and later became a key witness in the trial about the origins of the fire.
The Canadian Ronald Evans was Chaplain of St. John's for 15 years and retired on December 31, 2015.
His successor is James Buxton, formerly Dean of Chapel of Corpus Christi College, Cambridge, who was appointed as Chaplain of St. John’s İzmir and Mission to Seafarers Port Chaplain to İzmir on 18 September 2017.

Architecture 
The church was built in a neo-gothic architectural style. The architect of the church is unknown.

Exterior 
The exterior design is also neo-gothic. On the west façade, there is a little rose window. Also on that façade there is a spire. Under the rose window, there are three stained-glass windows, behind iron barriers. On the north façade there are small flying buttresses.

Stained-Glass Windows 
The back (west) window was made in Germany in 1895. The front (east) window was made in 1904 by Charles Kempe and includes a small panel showing Ignatius of Antioch on his way to martyrdom, being greeted in Smyrna by St. Polycarp, bishop of Smyrna, who kisses the martyr's chains.

Interior 

Inside of the church, the grave of William Edward Collins, Bishop of Gibraltar is on the left of the entrance, to the west. There is a baptismal font next to the grave, in the shape of a seashell, an ancient symbol of Christian pilgrimage. Behind that is the rose window. At the other end of the church, faced by the pews, is the altar, below three of the stained-glass windows.

Surroundings 

The Bishop Collins Memorial Hall was erected in 1913 and is used as a multi-purpose facility. The Sunday School meets in the hall and the hall and kitchen are used every Sunday for after service fellowship and tea time, as well as for various meetings and events. The church office is next to the fellowship hall. A vicarage was built next to the church in 1911 and is now leased to the British Government for use as the Consulate.

Worship
St. John's is liturgically Anglo-Catholic by tradition with the use of vestments, holy water and incense.

Notable burials
William Collins (bishop) (1867–1911), the Anglican Bishop of Gibraltar

Gallery

References

Churches in İzmir
Churches completed in 1899
19th-century Anglican church buildings
Anglican church buildings in Turkey
Anglo-Catholic church buildings in Turkey
John Izmir
19th-century churches in Turkey